Brakerøya Station is a railway station located at the village of Brakerøya in Drammen, Norway on the Drammen Line. The station is served by the Oslo Commuter Rail L13 service with half-hour headway by Vy.

History
The station was opened in 1873, one year after the Drammen Line. It was heavily rebuilt in 1973 when Lieråsen Tunnel was opened and a new double track from Lieråsen Tunnel to Brakerøya was built.

Railway stations in Buskerud
Railway stations on the Drammen Line
Railway stations opened in 1873
1873 establishments in Norway